Wiktor Jakowski (born July 18, 1999), better known by the stage name Kinny Zimmer, is a Polish rapper, songwriter, producer, and musician.

Career 
On June 3, 2019 Jakowski released his first album Aksonometria, which he produced himself. Later he released two EP's, Oko Ptaka Z Góry Patrzące on July 17, 2019, and Achhh on March 20, 2020. He also produced them both. They are not longer available on streaming services.

On July 10, 2020 Kinny joined rapper Szpaku's label GUGU. He announced the album SADBOY, CHŁOPAK Z SADU and released three singles, "IKEA", "Po Jabłkach", and "Jadę Nocą Na Mazurach". On December 6, 2020, he left the label, thus abandoning the concept of the announced album.

On September 15, 2021 the artist participated in the SBM Starter campaign, which aims to promote young rap talent. He presented himself in it with the single "Jazda". Later he released the single "Rozmazana kreska", which went viral on the app TikTok, spawning almost 30 milion views on the app. The music video was released on November 17, 2021, and has over 22 milion views on YouTube.

On January 7, 2022 he released a song "Benz-Dealer" featuring Quebonafide, becoming a new member of the SBM Label.

In 2022 he was featured on the singles "Powiemy Ci To W Twarz", "Zemsta Dzikusa", both by Lanek, and "LAXJFK" by Jan-Rapowanie. He also was featured on SBM Label's album Hotel Maffija 2. The album is certified platinum.

On April 12, 2022 Jakowski released the single "Dziecko" and announced his album Letnisko. The album was released on May 13, 2022. It reached number 15 on an official Polish sales list (OLiS) and is certified gold.

On June 23, 2022 White 2115's single "Pierwszy raz" featuring Kinny Zimmer was released.

Discography

Albums 

 Aksonometria (2019)
 Hotel Maffija 2 (with SBM Label) (2022), POL: platinum
 Letnisko (2022), POL: gold

EPs 

 Oko Ptaka Z Góry Patrzące (2019)
 Achhh (2020)

References 

Living people
1999 births
Polish rappers
Polish singer-songwriters
Polish singers
Male hip hop musicians